The Lewis's Building is a 20th-century Grade II listed building located in Liverpool, England. Purpose-built as the flagship store for the now defunct Lewis's department store chain, the building is set to be redeveloped as part of redevelopment project Central Village.

History
In 1856 men's and boy's clothing store Lewis's began trading from 19th century building on the current site. This building was eventually replaced in the 1910s and 1920s with a design by Gerald de Courcy Fraser which incorporated the adjacent Watson Building. During the Liverpool Blitz the building was mostly destroyed by bombs, requiring a rebuild which was again taken by Gerald de Courcy Fraser in 1947. The newly constructed  nine-storey 420,000 sq ft store opened in 1956 and operated until 29 May 2010.

Since the demise of Lewis's the building has been remained vacant apart from with a branch of PureGym currently occupying the basement floor since 2015. Large amounts of office space and a 125-room Adagio hotel will occupy the remaining floors.

Sculpture

To symbolise Liverpool's resurgence following World War II a statue made by Sir Jacob Epstein of a nude man was added above the building's  main entrance. Its official title is Liverpool Resurgent but is nicknamed locally as either 'Nobby Lewis' or 'Dickie Lewis'. The statue was unveiled for Lewis's Centenary celebrations in 1956, which came as the blitzed store had completed rebuilding. It is a well-known local meeting place, and was immortalised in the 1962 anthemic song In My Liverpool Home by Peter McGovern:
"We speak with an accent exceedingly rare,
Meet under a statue exceedingly bare"

References

Grade II listed hotels
Grade II listed buildings in Liverpool
Unused buildings in Liverpool